Choi Ji-na (born May 17, 1975) is a South Korean actress. She made her acting debut in 1995, and became best known as a supporting actress in television dramas, notably My Rosy Life (2005), A Happy Woman (2008), and My Too Perfect Sons (2009). In 2005, Choi received a Best Supporting Actress nomination at the Korean Film Awards for her portrayal of a shaman in Blood Rain.

Filmography

Television series

Film

Theater

Awards and nominations

References

External links 
 
 
 
 

1975 births
Living people
South Korean television actresses
South Korean film actresses
South Korean stage actresses
Place of birth missing (living people)